The Fifteenth Government of the Republic of Croatia is the current Croatian Government cabinet formed on 23 July 2020, following the 2020 election. It is led by Prime Minister Andrej Plenković.

Motions of confidence

Party breakdown
Party breakdown of cabinet ministers:

List of Ministers

Status in the Sabor
The cabinet is a two-party minority government composed of the Croatian Democratic Union (HDZ) and the Independent Democratic Serb Party (SDSS). Together these parties have a delegation made up of 64 Members of Parliament (out of 151 in total) and are thus short of an overall majority of 76 MPs by 12 seats. The government thus relies on outside parliamentary support from other parties and individual MPs to achieve such a majority. This support is provided by the HDZ's pre-electoral coalition partners - HSLS, HDS, HDSSB and independent MP Marijana Petir, as well as by MPs from several smaller parties - HNS-LD, NS-R, the Democratic Union of Hungarians, Kali Sara and the Union of Albanians, and finally by two independents representing national minorities - Furio Radin and Vladimir Bilek. In June 2021 the government's majority was increased to from 76 to 77 seats, when prime minister Plenković reached a mutual cooperation agreement with Silvano Hrelja's HSU.

Parliamentary seats held by parties in the cabinet (23 July 2020):

Parliamentary seats held by parties supporting the government (23 July 2020):

Former members

References

Plenkovic, Andrej
2020 establishments in Croatia
Cabinets established in 2020
Plenković